What We Found is a 2020 American thriller film written and directed by Ben Hickernell and starring Elizabeth Mitchell, James Ransone, Brandon Larracuente, Oona Laurence, Jordan Hall and Yetide Badaki.

Cast
Jordan Hall as Marcus Jackson
Oona Laurence as Holly
Julian Shatkin as Grant
Giorgia Whigham as Cassie
Yetide Badaki as Alex
Brandon Larracuente as Clay Howard
Elizabeth Mitchell as Katherine Hillman
James Ransone as Steve Mohler
Casey Hartnett as Emily

Release
The film was released on DVD and VOD on August 4, 2020.

Reception
Barbara Shulgasser-Parker of Common Sense Media awarded the film three stars out of five.

References

External links
 
 

American thriller films
2020 films
2020 thriller films
2020s English-language films
2020s American films